John Moores may refer to:
John H. Moores (1821–1880), American businessman and politician in the state of Oregon
Sir John Moores (British businessman) (1896–1993), British businessman who founded Littlewoods
John Moores Jr. (1928–2012), his son, businessman and chancellor of Liverpool John Moores University
John Moores (baseball) (born 1944), American entrepreneur and former owner of the San Diego Padres
Liverpool John Moores University, a university in Liverpool, England, named after Sir John Moores

See also
John Moore (disambiguation)